The dark grey ground snake (Elapoidis fusca) is a snake endemic to Indonesia and Malaysia.

References 

Colubrids
Reptiles of Malaysia
Reptiles of Indonesia
Reptiles described in 1826